Khanty-Mansi Autonomous Okrug–Yugra (Russian and Mansi: Ханты-Мансийский автономный округ — Югра, Khanty-Mansiysky avtonomny okrug — Yugra; Khanty: Хӑнты-Мансийской Aвтономной Округ) or Khantia-Mansia is a federal subject of Russia (an autonomous okrug of Tyumen Oblast). It has a population of 1,532,243 as of the 2010 Census.

The peoples native to the region are the Khanty and the Mansi, known collectively as Ob-Ugric people, but today the two groups only constitute 2.5% of the region's population. The local languages, Khanty and Mansi, enjoy special status in the autonomous okrug and along with their distant relative Hungarian are part of the Ugric branch of the Finno-Ugric languages. Russian remains the only official language.

In 2012, the majority (51%) of the oil produced in Russia came from Khanty-Mansi Autonomous Okrug, giving the region great economic importance in Russia and the world.
It borders Yamalo-Nenets Autonomous Okrug to the north, Komi Republic to the northwest, Sverdlovsk Oblast to the west, Tyumen Oblast to the south, Tomsk Oblast to the south and southeast and Krasnoyarsk Krai in the east.

History
The okrug was established on December 10, 1930, as Ostyak-Vogul National Okrug. In October 1940, it was renamed the Khanty-Mansi National Okrug. In 1977, along with other national okrugs of the Russian SFSR, it became an autonomous okrug (Khanty-Mansi Autonomous Okrug). The administrative center is Khanty-Mansiysk. In 2003, the word "Yugra" was appended to the official name.

Geography

The okrug occupies the central part of the West Siberian Plain.

Principal rivers include the Ob and its tributaries Irtysh and Vatinsky Yogan. There are numerous lakes in the okrug, the largest ones are Numto, Tormemtor, Leushinsky Tuman and Tursuntsky Tuman, among others.

The northeasterly line of equal latitude and longitude traverses the Khanty-Mansi Autonomous Okrug.

Administrative divisions

Demographics
Population: 1,674,676	(2020); 

Khanty-Mansi Autonomous Okrug has an area of 523,100 km2, but the area is sparsely populated. The administrative center is Khanty-Mansiysk, but the largest cities are Surgut, Nizhnevartovsk, and Nefteyugansk.

Settlements

Ethnic groups
The indigenous population (Khanty, Mansi, Komi, and Nenets) is only 2.8% of the total population in the Khanty-Mansi Autonomous Okrug. The exploitation of natural gas in Khanty-Mansi Autonomous Okrug has attracted immigrants from all over the former Soviet Union. The 2021 Census counted 17 ethnic groups of more than five thousand persons each. The ethnic composition is as follows:

Population of Khanty-Mansi Autonomous Okrug:

Historical population figures are shown below:

Vital statistics

Source:

Religion

According to a 2012 survey 38.1% of the population of Yugra adheres to the Russian Orthodox Church, 5% are unaffiliated generic Christians, 1% of the population adheres to the Slavic native faith (Rodnovery) or to Khanty-Mansi native faith. Muslims (mostly Tatars) constitute 11% of the population. In addition, 23% of the population declares to be spiritual but not religious, 11% is atheist, and 10.9% follows other religions or did not give an answer to the question.
According to recent reports Jehovah's Witnesses have been subjected to torture and detention in Surgut.

Transport
In Khanty-Mansi Autonomous Okrug, the primary transport of goods is by water and railway transport; 29% is transported by road, and 2% by aviation. The total length of railway tracks is 1,106 km. The length of roads is more than 18,000 km.

See also

 Hockey Club Ugra
 List of Chairmen of the Duma of the Khanty-Mansi Autonomous Okrug

References

External links

 Official website of Khanty-Mansiysk Autonomous Okrug – Yugra
 Official site of Khanty-Mansi Duma 
 Informational website of Khanty-Mansiysk Autonomous Okrug – Yugra 

 
Russian-speaking countries and territories
States and territories established in 1930